Induno may refer to:

 Domenico Induno, Italian painter 
 Gerolamo Induno, Italian painter
 Induno Olona, town and comune in Italy, in north-western Lombardy in the Province of Varese 
 Induno Ticino, village in the Metropolitan City of Milan in the Italian region Lombardy